Members of the New South Wales Legislative Council who served from 1925 to 1927 were appointed for life by the Governor on the advice of the Premier. This list includes members between the 1925 state election on 30 May 1925 and the 1927 state election on 8 October 1927. The President was Fred Flowers. The Labor platform included the abolition of the Legislative Council. At the opening of the new parliament on 24 June 1925 there were 75 members of the council, with just 23  members and Premier Jack Lang had been seeking to appoint 25 new members, however the Governor Sir Dudley de Chair had declined to do so in September 1925. In December the Governor agreed to make the appointments in circumstances that are disputed. De Chair understood there was an agreement that the appointments would not be used to abolish the Legislative Council, while Lang said he gave no such undertaking. All 25 appointees took the pledge to implement the Labor platform, "including the abolition of the Legislative Council", similar to that signed by other Labor members.

In January 1926 Albert Willis, the Representative of the Government in the Legislative Council sought leave to introduce the Constitution (Amendment) Bill (No. 2) that would abolish the Legislative Council, which was granted 45 votes to 43. Parliament was prorogued to gain a tactical advantage by cancelling pair agreements while 3 opponents of abolition were out of the country, which caused the bill to lapse. Willis sought leave to resume debate on the bill however this was defeated by 47 votes to 41. Two Labor members had voted against the bill, Frank Bryant  and John Percival. A further six Labor members were absent from the chamber, Carl Akhurst, Percy Hordern, William Kelly, James Lyons, Thomas Murray and Duncan Smith. Hordern had leave as he was seriously ill and died on 1 April 1926. Bryant and Percival immediately resigned from the Labor party however on 5 March 1926 the party executive refused to accept their resignations and expelled them instead. The five members who had been absent without cause were required to justify why they should not be expelled, and the party conference held on 10 April 1926 voted to expel them. 4 non Labor members were also absent, Alexander Brown was seriously ill and died on 28 March 1926, John Wetherspoon's wife died the previous day, while Sir Owen Cox and Norman Kater were out of the country.

See also
First Lang Ministry
Second Lang Ministry

Notes

References

Members of New South Wales parliaments by term
20th-century Australian politicians